The year 1634 in music involved some significant events.

Events
February 3 – James Shirley's spectacular masque The Triumph of Peace is performed in London. The work features music by William Lawes, Simon Ives, and Bulstrode Whitelocke.  It is repeated on February 13.
September 29 (Michaelmas) – The masque Comus, by John Milton, is presented at Ludlow Castle, with music composed by Henry Lawes.

Publications
Ignazio Donati – First book of motets for solo voice, Op. 16 (Venice: Alessandro Vincenti)
Melchior Franck
 for four and six voices (Coburg: Johann Forckel), two funeral motets
  for four, five, six, and eight voices (Coburg: Johann Forckel), in both Lain and German
 for four voices (Coburg, Johann Forckel), a funeral motet

Classical music
Charles d'Ambleville – Octonarium sacrum

Opera 
William Lawes – The Triumph of Peace

Births
January 7 – Adam Krieger, composer (died 1666)
March 26 – Domenico Freschi, composer (died 1710)
date unknown
Clamor Heinrich Abel, German composer (died 1696)
Marc-Antoine Charpentier, French composer (died 1704)
probable
Carlo Grossi, composer (died 1688)
Antonio Draghi, Italian composer (died 1700)

Deaths
October – George Kirbye, composer (born c.1565)
November 15 – Johann Staden, organist and composer (born 1581)
date unknown – Adriano Banchieri, Italian composer (born 1568)

 
Music
17th century in music
Music by year